The Joy Homestead, also known as the Job Joy House, is an historic house on Old Scituate Avenue in Cranston, Rhode Island.  This -story gambrel-roof wood-frame house was built sometime between 1764 and 1778.  It was occupied by members of the Joy family until 1884, and was acquired by the Cranston Historical Society in 1959.  The house is believed to a stopping point on the first day's march in 1781 of the French Army troops en route from Providence to Yorktown during the American Revolutionary War.

The house was listed on the National Register of Historic Places in 1971.  The Historical Society offers tours.

See also
Nathan Westcott House, another 18th-century house next door
National Register of Historic Places listings in Providence County, Rhode Island

References

External links
Cranston Historical Society

Houses on the National Register of Historic Places in Rhode Island
Houses in Cranston, Rhode Island
Museums in Providence County, Rhode Island
Historic house museums in Rhode Island
National Register of Historic Places in Providence County, Rhode Island